The  is a collective term for the groups of islands that are located to the south of the Japanese archipelago in Micronesia. The Nanpō Islands are all administered by Tokyo Metropolis.

The Hydrographic and Oceanographic Department of the Japan Coast Guard defines the Nanpō Shotō as follows:

 Nanpō Shotō (Nanpō Islands)
 Izu Shotō (Izu Islands)
 Ogasawara Guntō (Bonin Islands)
 Mukojima Rettō
 Chichijima Rettō
 Hahajima Rettō
 Kazan Rettō (Volcano Islands)
 Kita Iwo Jima (North Iwo Jima)
 Iwo Jima
 Minami Iwo Jima (South Iwo Jima)
 Nishinoshima
 Okinotorishima
 Minamitorishima

The Geospatial Information Authority of Japan, a government agency that is responsible for standardization of place names, does not use the term Nanpō Shotō, although it has agreed with the Japan Coast Guard over the names and extents of the subgroups of the Nanpō Shotō.

The Japanese claim to have discovered the islands in 1593; however, many of the islands were known by the Spanish sailors that went from Philippines to New Spain since Bernardo de la Torre's voyage in 1543, while the British claimed the islands in 1827. However, archeological evidence has since revealed that some of the islands were prehistorically inhabited by members of an unknown Micronesian ethnicity.

Neither Japan nor Britain developed the Nanpō Islands, although a small colony of Europeans and Americans was established at Chichi-jima. Japan began colonizing the islands in 1853, claimed them in 1861, then finally annexed them in 1891 as part of Tokyo Prefecture. By the mid-1930s the islands were closed to foreigners and a small Imperial Japanese Navy base was established at Chichi-jima.

See also
 List of governors of the Nanpō Islands
 Ogasawara subtropical moist forests
 Ryukyu Islands

References

Izu–Bonin–Mariana Arc
Islands of Tokyo
Archipelagoes of Japan
Archipelagoes of the Pacific Ocean